The 2006 World Fencing Championships were held at the Oval Lingotto in Turin, Italy. The event took place from 29 September to 7 October 2006. Same Thing of the 2006 Winter Olympics

Medal table

Medal summary

Men's events

Women's events

References
FIE Results

World Fencing Championships
W
Fencing Championships
Sports competitions in Turin
International fencing competitions hosted by Italy
September 2006 sports events in Europe
2000s in Turin
October 2006 sports events in Europe